Brooklyn Community Pride Center is a 501(c)(3) nonprofit LGBTQ+ community center in Brooklyn, New York. Incorporated in 2008, it was the first LGBTQ+ center in Bedford–Stuyvesant, Brooklyn.

History
Brooklyn Community Pride Center was the first LGBTQ+ center in Bedford–Stuyvesant, Brooklyn. As of 2020, it remains the only LGBTQ+ center there.

Erin Drinkwater served as executive director of the center from 2012 through 2014. During this time, the center moved from its 600-square-foot walk-up quarters to a 1,600 square-foot facility. In 2014, Deborah Brennan joined the center's board of directors and in 2015 became president of the board. She then recruited Floyd Rumohr as the center's new chief executive officer. In January 2021, Deborah Brennan transitioned off the board and Sonelius Kendrick-Smith was elected president.

In 2020, the center signed a 30-year lease for a new headquarters, to be located inside a section of the Bedford Union Armory in Crown Heights. The new space is to contain Brooklyn's "first dedicated mental health LGBTQ clinic", while the old space will be retained and dedicated to youth programming and services.

Projects
LGBTQ New Americans Project, an oral history project of lesbian, gay, bisexual, transgender, and queer immigrants living in New York City launched in 2016 in collaboration with Immigration Equality

Programs and Services
Services and programs provided by the center include:

 Health and wellness services for youth, the elderly, and transgender and gender-nonconforming individuals, as well as Brooklyn's first clinic devoted to LGBTQ mental health
 Homelessness and housing including a laundry facility for use by LGBTQ homeless persons
 Pride Path Workforce Development
 Social Isolation
Immigration
Racial Justice

References
LGBT health organizations in the United States
LGBT organizations based in New York City
Organizations established in 2008
2008 establishments in New York City

External links 

 
LGBT community centers in the United States